Croce Taravella (born 1964 in Polizzi Generosa) is an Italian painter.

Biography 
Croce Taravella was born in 1964 in Polizzi Generosa, in the Metropolitan City of Palermo on the island of Sicily. Taravella studied at the Academy of Fine Arts in Palermo (Accademia di Belle Arti di Palermo). Between 1983 and 1984, curator and art dealer Lucio Amelio, who introduced Taravella to members of the transavanguardia, as well as Andy Warhol, Joseph Beuys, Robert Rauschenberg, Nino Longobardi, and Mimmo Paladino.

In the 1990s he moved to Rome where he worked as a production designer for RAI.

In 2011, he participated in the Italian Pavilion curated by Vittorio Sgarbi at the 54th Venice Biennale.

Bibliography 
 Eva Di Stefano, Croce Taravella: Opere 1983-2004, Falcone, Palermo, 2004. 978-8888335100

References

External links 
 Croce Taravella examples of work at artnet.com

1964 births
Living people
21st-century Italian painters
20th-century Italian painters
Italian male painters
Italian contemporary artists
20th-century Italian male artists
21st-century Italian male artists